Kentucky Route 728 (KY 728) is an east–west state highway that traverses Edmonson and Hart Counties in south-central Kentucky.

Route description
KY 728 has its western terminus at an intersection with KY 259 between the communities Bee Spring and Sweeden, just north of Kyrock Elementary School. It bypasses the original site of the old town called Kyrock, and it then traverses Nolin Dam, with the tail water of the Nolin River on the right, and Nolin Lake on the left. About  afterward, it meets its first intersection with KY 1827, which starts near Nolin Lake State Park. It then runs concurrently with KY 1827 for a few miles; they split after the intersection with Ollie Road, which goes to the Houchin's Ferry. KY 1827 goes straight, while KY 728 makes a diagonal left turn at the second intersection of the two state routes. KY 728 goes through more countryside before reaching the Hart County line.

KY 728 makes its entrance into Hart County and then has one more intersection with KY 1827, which marks KY 1827's eastern terminus. KY 728 goes on into Cub Run to intersect with KY  88. KY 728 continues into the northwestern part of Hart County, and then makes a right turn to the east to meet U.S. Route 31W (US 31W) in Bonnieville. After Bonnieville, KY 728 has a junction with Interstate 65 (I-65) at the exit 71 interchange, and a few miles later, KY 728 would meet its eastern terminus at an intersection with KY 357 in Hammonville, just south of the Hart–LaRue county line.

Major intersections

References

External links
KY 728 at Kentucky Roads

0728
0728
0728